Brachyopomorpha is a clade of stereospondyl temnospondyls within the infraorder Trematosauria. It was constructed in 2000 to include Bothriceps australis and the superfamily Brachyopoidea. It is phylogenetically defined as a stem-based taxon including Pelorocephalus and all taxa closer to it than to Rhytidosteus. In contrast, Brachyopoidea is defined as a node-based taxon including Brachyops and Pelorocephalus and all descendants of their most recent common ancestor. Because Bothriceps is not thought to be a descendant of that recent common ancestor and would be more basal than it, the genus is placed just outside Brachyopoidea and is considered to be a sister taxon to the clade.

Bothriceps was once considered to be a brachyopid within Brachyopoidea, but is now placed on the brachyopoid stem closer to Brachyopoidea than to Rhytidosteidae due to the presence of several plesiomorphies (ancestral characters). The probable presence of a tabular horn in Bothriceps also suggests that it is a basal brachyopomorph rather than a brachyopid.

Keratobrachyops, once assigned to Chigutisauridae, is now thought to be a basal brachyopomorph closely related to Bothriceps.

References

External links

Trematosaurs
Triassic temnospondyls
Jurassic temnospondyls
Cretaceous temnospondyls
Early Triassic first appearances
Cretaceous extinctions